Shusha FK was an Azerbaijani football club based in Baku. It represented the city of Shusha.

History 
The club was founded on 1 September 2009 as Shusha, then changed its name to Shusha 09. In 2010, club once again returned to its old name and immediately admitted to the Azerbaijan First Division in 2010.

Shusha FK was dissolved on 18 July 2015, after main sponsors SOCAR stopped funding the club.

League and domestic cup history 
As of 16 March 2012:

Managers 
 Evez Mamedov (2009–2010)
 Metin Demirkiran (2010)
 Nadir Gasymov (2010–2015)
             Guleli Bagirov prezident (23.05.2016)

References

External links 
 FC Shusha at PFL.AZ

Shusha
Association football clubs established in 2009
Football clubs in Baku
2009 establishments in Azerbaijan
2015 disestablishments in Azerbaijan
Defunct football clubs in Azerbaijan
Association football clubs disestablished in 2015
Shusha